Mohd Khairul Izuan bin Rosli (born 9 March 1991) is a Malaysian professional footballer who plays for Malaysia Super League club UiTM. Khairul Izuan mainly plays as an attacking midfielder but can also play as a second striker or as a right winger.

Club career
Khairul Izuan began his career with Kelantan U21 team in 2007 before moved and played for Harimau Muda in Liga Premier in 2008 and 2009.

Khairul Izuan signed with Malaysian Armed Forces football club in 2010. After a season there, he returns and played for Kelantan's youth team. Khairul Izuan was part of the winning team in the 2010 Malaysia President Cup. The next season, he was a substitute on the Kelantan senior team.

Career statistics

Club

International career
Khairul Izuan made many appearances for the Malaysia under-19 team since 2009.

Honours

Club
Kelantan U21
 Piala Presiden:2010

Kelantan
 Liga Super: 2011, 2012; Runner-up 2010
 Piala Malaysia: 2010, 2012; Runner-up 2009
 Piala FA: 2012, 2012; Runner-up 2011, 2009, 2015
 Piala Sumbangsih: 2011; Runner-up 2012, 2013

References

External links 
 Profile at theredwarriorsfc.com
 Mohd Khairul Izuan Rosli at SoccerPunter.com
 

1991 births
Living people
Malaysian footballers
Kelantan FA players
ATM FA players
Negeri Sembilan FA players
People from Kota Bharu
People from Kelantan
Malaysia Super League players
Association football midfielders
Association football forwards
Malaysian people of Malay descent